LY-255582 is a phenylpiperidine non-selective opioid antagonist. It has been shown to reduce ethanol consumption in experiments carried out on rats. It has also been shown to reduce food and water consumption in rats.

See also
 κ-Opioid receptor § Antagonists
 List of investigational antidepressants

References

Mu-opioid receptor antagonists
Kappa-opioid receptor antagonists
4-Phenylpiperidines